Beck: The Eye of the Storm is a 2009 film about the Swedish police detective Martin Beck, directed by Harald Hamrell. It is the 25th film in the series of chief inspector Martin Beck with Peter Haber in the role of Beck and Mikael Persbrandt as Gunvald Larsson. The producer is Lars Blomgren and production company is Filmlance.

Plot 
Martin Beck and his colleagues are linked by the discovery of a burned female body to the hunt for a group of environmentalists engaged in terrorism across borders. Gunvald Larsson knew the woman believed to have been murdered and is suspected by SÄPO (Swedish Security Services) of involvement. Whilst the terrorists plan an attack that could have dire consequences officially Gunvald is off the case.

Cast
 Peter Haber as Martin Beck
 Mikael Persbrandt as Gunvald Larsson
 Måns Nathanaelson as Oskar Bergman
 Ingvar Hirdwall as Martin Beck's neighbour
 Sven Ahlström as Tore Wiman
 Ann-Sofie Rase as Anita Åstrand
 Kirsti Torhaug as Kim Reeshaug
 Christoffer Hedén as Tom Reeshaug
 Daniel Götschenhielm as Lars Behger
Stephen Rappaport
 Daniel Goldmann
 Suzanna Dilber
 Johannes Alfvén
Erik Johansson
 Tobias Aspelin
 Marianne Sand Näslund
 Leila Haji as Merlina

References

External links 

2009 television films
2009 films
2000s Swedish-language films
2000s crime films
Martin Beck films
Films directed by Harald Hamrell
2000s police procedural films
2000s Swedish films